Kenneth Andrew Ferrie (born 28 September 1978) is an English professional golfer.

Early life and amateur career
Ferrie was born in Ashington, Northumberland. He won the British Boys Championship in 1996 and made his first appearance in a European Tour event that year as an invitee at his local event, the Slaley Hall Northumberland Challenge. He attended Midland College in Texas, United States, where he was a two time NJCAA All-American.

Professional career
Ferrie turned professional in 1999. He began his career on the second tier Challenge Tour in 2000, claiming his first win at the Tessali Open del Sud. He was successful at the 2000 qualifying school, earning the right to play on the European Tour, but he initially struggled at that level, although he continued to have success on the Challenge Tour capturing his second title at the Challenge Total Fina Elf. At the end of the season he had to return to the qualifying school to retain his tour card for 2002.

In 2002, Ferrie just did enough to retain his playing status on the European Tour, ending the season in 112th place on the Order of Merit, thanks largely to finishing tied for 3rd in the Novotel Perrier Open de France. The following season, Ferrie won for the first time on the European Tour at the Canarias Open de Espana, securing his place on tour for two years. In 2005 he came from behind to win the Smurfit European Open, one of the leading tournaments in Europe, and went on to finish the season a career best 11th on the Order of Merit, with the win also giving him a five-year exemption on the tour.

In the 2006 U.S. Open at Winged Foot, Ferrie held the sole lead for part of the third round before ending it tied at the top of the leaderboard with Phil Mickelson. He was unable to maintain his challenge and recorded a final round 76 to slip back into a tie for sixth, three strokes behind winner Geoff Ogilvy.

Following an unsuccessful season on the European Tour in 2007, Ferrie played on the U.S.-based PGA Tour in 2008 having earned his card through qualifying school. However he failed to earn enough prize-money to maintain his playing rights and in 2009 returned to the European Tour. He won his third European Tour title in 2011.

Ferrie lost his full European Tour playing rights at the end of 2012 and did not complete qualifying school.

Ferrie's brother Iain is also a professional golfer, who has played on the Challenge Tour.

Amateur wins (1)
1996 Boys Amateur Championship

Professional wins (6)

European Tour wins (3)

European Tour playoff record (2–0)

Challenge Tour wins (2)

Other wins (1)
2005 Northern Rock Masters

Results in major championships

CUT = missed the half-way cut
WD = Withdrew
"T" = tied

Results in World Golf Championships

"T" = Tied

Team appearances
Amateur
Jacques Léglise Trophy (representing Great Britain & Ireland): 1996
European Youths' Team Championship (representing England): 1998
Professional
Royal Trophy (representing Europe): 2006 (winners)

See also
2007 PGA Tour Qualifying School graduates

References

External links

English male golfers
European Tour golfers
PGA Tour golfers
Sportspeople from Ashington
1978 births
Living people